With an area of , Romania is the twelfth-largest country in Europe. Located in Central and  Southeastern Europe, bordering on the Black Sea, the country is halfway between the equator and the North Pole and equidistant from the westernmost part of Europe—the Atlantic Coast—and the most easterly—the Ural Mountains. Romania has  of border. Republic of Moldova and Ukraine lies to the east, Bulgaria lies to the south, and Serbia and Hungary to the west. In the southeast,  of sea coastline provide an important outlet to the Black Sea and the Atlantic Ocean.

History
Traditionally Romania is divided into several historic regions that no longer perform any administrative function:
Dobruja is the easternmost region, extending from the northward course of the Danube to the shores of the Black Sea.

Moldavia stretches from the Eastern Carpathians to the Prut River on the Moldovan and Ukrainian border.

Wallachia reaches south from the Transylvanian Alps to the Bulgarian border and is divided by the Olt River into Oltenia on the west and Muntenia on the east. The Danube forms a natural border between Muntenia and Dobruja.

The west-central region, known as Transylvania, is delimited by the arc of the Carpathians, which separates it from the Maramureș region in the northwest; by the Crișana area, which borders Hungary in the west; and by the Banat region of the southwest, which adjoins both Hungary and Serbia. It is these areas west of the Carpathians that contain the highest concentrations of the nation's largest ethnic minorities—Hungarians, Germans, and Serbs.

Romania's exterior boundaries are a result of relatively recent events. At the outbreak of World War I, the country's territory included only the provinces of Walachia, Moldavia, and Dobruja. This area, known as the Regat or the Old Kingdom, came into being with the disintegration of the Ottoman Empire in the mid-nineteenth century. At the end of World War I, Romania acquired Transylvania and the Banat. Some of this territory was lost during World War II, but negotiations returned it to Romania. Although this acquisition united some 85 percent of the Romanian-speaking population of Eastern Europe into one nation, it left a considerable number of ethnic Hungarians under Romanian rule. Disputes between Hungary and Romania regarding this territory would surface regularly, as both considered the region part of their national heritage. Questions were also periodically raised as to the historical validity of the Soviet-Romanian border. Bukovina and Bessarabia, former Romanian provinces where significant percentages of the population are Romanian-speaking, were part of the Soviet Union from the end of World War II to its dissolution, and subsequently part of the (formerly Soviet) states of Ukraine and Moldova. Despite ongoing and potential disputes, however, since 1989 Romania has no territorial claims to make.

Romania's current administrative divisions include 41 counties and one city - Bucharest - with special status, see Administrative divisions of Romania.

Topography

Romania's natural landscape is almost evenly divided among mountains (23 percent), plains (39 percent), and hills (35 percent). These varied relief forms spread rather symmetrically from the Carpathian Mountains, which reach elevations of more than 2,500 meters, to the Danube Delta, which is just a few meters above sea level.

The arc of the Carpathians extends over 1,000 kilometers through the center of the country, covering an area of 71,000 square kilometers. These mountains are of low to medium altitude and are no wider than 100 kilometers. They are deeply fragmented by longitudinal and transverse valleys and crossed by several major rivers. These features and the fact that there are many summit passes—some at altitudes up to 2,256 meters—have made the Carpathians less of a barrier to movement than other European ranges. Another distinguishing feature is the many eroded platforms that provide tableland at relatively high altitudes. There are permanent settlements here at above 1,200 meters.

Romania's Carpathians are differentiated into three ranges: the Eastern Carpathians, the Southern Carpathians or Transylvanian Alps, and the Western Romanian Carpathians. Each of these ranges has important distinguishing features. The Eastern Carpathians are composed of three parallel ridges that run from northwest to southeast. The westernmost ridge is an extinct volcanic range with many preserved cones and craters. The range has many large depressions, in the largest of which the city of Brașov is situated. Important mining and industrial centers as well as agricultural areas are found within these depressions. The Eastern Carpathians are covered with forests—some 32 percent of the country's woodlands are there. They also contain important ore deposits, including gold and silver, and their mineral water springs feed numerous health resorts.

The Southern Carpathians offer the highest peaks at Moldoveanu Peak (2,544 m) and Negoiu (2,535 m) and more than 150 glacial lakes. They have large grassland areas and some woodlands but few large depressions and subsoil resources. At higher elevations, the wind and rain have turned the rocks into spectacular figures such as the Sphinx and Babele.

The region was crisscrossed by an ancient network of trans-Carpathian roads, and vestiges of the old Roman Way are still visible. Numerous passes and the valleys of the Olt, Jiu, and Danube rivers provide routes for roads and railways through the mountains.

The Western Romanian Carpathians are the lowest of the three ranges and are fragmented by many deep structural depressions. They have historically functioned as "gates," which allow easy passage but can be readily defended. The most famous of these is the Iron Gate on the Danube. The Western Romanian Carpathians are the most densely settled, and it is in the northernmost area of this range, the Apuseni Mountains, that permanent settlements can be found at the highest altitudes.

Enclosed within the great arc of the Carpathians lie the undulating plains and low hills of the Transylvanian Plateau—the largest tableland in the country and the center of Romania. This important agricultural region also contains large deposits of methane gas and salt. To the south and east of the Carpathians, the Sub-Carpathians form a fringe of rolling terrain ranging from 396 to 1,006 meters in elevation. This terrain is matched in the west by the slightly lower Western Hills. The symmetry of Romania's relief continues with the Getic Tableland to the south of the Sub-Carpathians, the Moldavian Tableland in the east between the Sub-Carpathians and the Prut River, and the Dobrujan Tableland in the southeast between the Danube and the Black Sea. The Sub-Carpathians and the tableland areas provide good conditions for human settlement and are important areas for fruit growing, viticulture, and other agricultural activity. They also contain large deposits of brown coal and natural gas.

Beyond the Carpathian foothills and tablelands, the plains spread south and west. In the southern parts of the country, the lower Danube Plain is divided by the Olt River; east of the river lies the Wallachian Plain (including the strategically important Focșani Gate), and to the west is the Oltenian or Western Plain. The land here is rich with chernozemic soils and forms Romania's most important farming region. Irrigation is widely used, and marshlands in the Danube's floodplain have been diked and drained to provide additional tillable land.

Romania's lowest land is found on the northern edge of the Dobruja region in the Danube Delta. The delta is a triangular swampy area of marshes, floating reed islands, and sandbanks, where the Danube ends its trek of almost 3,000 kilometers and divides into three frayed branches before emptying into the Black Sea. The Danube Delta provides a large part of the country's fish production, and its reeds are used to manufacture cellulose. The region also serves as a nature preserve for rare species of plant and animal life including migratory birds.

Hydrography

Rivers

After entering the country in the southwest at Bazias, the Danube travels some 1,075 kilometers (almost 40% of its entire length) through or along Romanian territory, forming the southern frontier with Serbia and Bulgaria. Virtually all of the country's rivers are tributaries of the Danube, either directly or indirectly, and by the time the Danube's course ends in the Black Sea, they account for nearly 40 percent of the total discharge. The most important of these rivers are the Mureș River, the Olt River, the Prut, the Siret River, the Ialomița River, the Someș River, and the Argeș River. The Olt River  is the longest river that is fully within Romania's national borders.

Romania's rivers primarily flow east, west, and south from the central crown of the Carpathians. They are fed by rainfall and melting snow, which causes considerable fluctuation in discharge and occasionally catastrophic flooding. In the east, river waters are collected by the Siret and the Prut. In the south, the rivers flow directly into the Danube, and in the west, waters are collected by the Tisza on Hungarian territory.

The Danube is by far Romania's most important river, not only for transportation, but also for the production of hydroelectric power. One of Europe's largest hydroelectric stations is located at the Iron Gates, where the Danube surges through the Carpathian gorges. The Danube is an important water route for domestic shipping, as well as international trade. It is navigable for river vessels along its entire Romanian course and for seagoing ships as far as the port of Brăila. An obvious problem with the use of the Danube for inland transportation is its remoteness from most of the major industrial centers. Moreover, marshy banks and perennial flooding impede navigation in some areas.

Lakes
There are over 3,500 lakes in Romania.

Climate

Because of its position on the southeastern portion of the European continent, Romania has a climate that is transitional between temperate and continental. Climatic conditions are somewhat modified by the country's varied relief. The Carpathians serve as a barrier to Atlantic air masses, restricting their oceanic influences to the west and center of the country, where they make for milder winters and heavier rainfall. The mountains also block the continental influences of the vast plain to the north in Ukraine, which bring frosty winters and less rain to the south and southeast. In the extreme southeast, Mediterranean influences offer a milder, maritime climate. Rainfall, although adequate throughout the country, decreases from west to east and from mountains to plains.

Temperate; cold, cloudy winters with frequent snow and fog; sunny summers with frequent showers and thunderstorms. Winters generally are from November to March. The springs are short, occasionally turning right into summer. Summer lasts from May to August. They have a prolonged Autumn, from September to November.
Facts: Record High Temperature:  - August 10, 1951 South-Eastern Romania; Record Low Temperature:  - January 24, 1942 (Central Romania)

Location
Southeastern Europe, bordering the Black Sea and Danube, with the Carpathian mountains in its center. Controls most easily traversable land route between the Balkans, Moldova and Ukraine

Geographic coordinates:

Extreme points of Romania:
Northernmost point: , a village in Botoșani County, on the border with Ukraine, 
Southernmost point: Zimnicea, a town in Teleorman County, on the border with Bulgaria, 
Westernmost point: Beba Veche, a village in Timiș County, on the border with Hungary and Serbia, 
Easternmost point: Sulina, a town in Tulcea County, on the Danube Delta,

Area
Total: 

 Land: 
 Water:

Land boundaries
Total: 

Coastline

Length: 
Maritime claims: Snake Island
contiguous zone: 
continental shelf: 200 m depth or to the depth of exploitation
exclusive economic zone:  with 
territorial sea:

Terrain

Central Transylvanian Basin is separated from the Plain of Moldavia on the east by the Carpathian Mountains and separated from the Wallachian Plain on the south by the Transylvanian Alps.

Elevation extremes:
lowest point: Black Sea 0 m
highest point: Moldoveanu Peak 2,544 m, Negoiu Peak 2,535 m

Natural resources
petroleum (reserves steady to declining), timber, natural gas, coal, iron ore, salt, arable land, hydro power

Land use:
arable land: 41%
permanent crops: 3%
permanent pastures: 21%
forests and woodland: 29%
other: 6% (1993 est.)

Irrigated land:
31,020 km (1993 est.)

Natural hazards: earthquakes are most severe in south and southwest; geologic structure and climate promote landslides

Environment

 Current issues: soil erosion and degradation; water pollution; air pollution in south from industrial effluents; contamination of Danube delta wetlands
 Environment: international agreements:
 party to: Air Pollution, Antarctic Treaty, Biodiversity, Climate Change, Desertification, Endangered Species, Environmental Modification, Hazardous Wastes, Law of the Sea, Nuclear Test Ban, Ozone Layer Protection, Ship Pollution, Wetlands
 signed, but not ratified: Air Pollution-Persistent Organic Pollutants, Antarctic-Environmental Protocol, Climate Change-Kyoto Protocol

See also
 Administrative divisions of Romania
 List of cities in Romania
 Reservoirs and dams in Romania
 List of mountain peaks in Romania
 List of fish of the Black Sea

References

External links 
  2004 Romanian Statistical Yearbook - Geography, Meteorology and Environment